Mladen Vulić (born 1 September 1969) is a Croatian actor. He appeared in more than thirty films since 1996.

Selected filmography

References

External links 

1969 births
Living people
People from Vinkovci
Croatian male film actors